Alfred Praks (31 March 1902 – 18 October 1998) was an Estonian wrestler. He competed at the 1924 and the 1928 Summer Olympics.

In 1944, Praks fled the Soviet occupation of Estonia and settled in Sweden.

References

External links
 

1902 births
1998 deaths
Sportspeople from Tallinn
People from the Governorate of Estonia
Olympic wrestlers of Estonia
Wrestlers at the 1924 Summer Olympics
Wrestlers at the 1928 Summer Olympics
Estonian male sport wrestlers
Estonian World War II refugees
Estonian emigrants to Sweden
20th-century Estonian people